Kiprugut is a surname of Kenyan origin meaning "son of Rugut". Notable people with the surname include:

Meriem Wangari Kiprugut (born 1979), Kenyan road running athlete
Wilson Kiprugut (1938–2022), Kenyan middle-distance runner and two-time Olympic medallist

Kalenjin names